Len is a Canadian alternative rock duo based in Toronto, Ontario. The band consists of siblings Marc Costanzo (vocals, guitar) and Sharon Costanzo (vocals, bass) and a revolving lineup of touring and studio musicians.

History
Marc Costanzo began recreationally recording music at the age of 13 years old. These recordings were predominately helmed by Marc, although his older sister Sharon sometimes contributed vocals to the recordings. In 1991, Marc began to produce music under the pseudonym of Len as a solo project. The name was taken from a high school friend of Marc's named Lenny. Sharon officially joined this project a year later, thus marking Len's first iteration as a duo. Len began as a punk rock band, with pop music influences. Between 1992 and 1997, the brother-sister duo independently released a self-titled extended play and two studio albums, Superstar (1995) and Get Your Legs Broke (1997). Marc estimated both albums sold around 10-15,000 units each. While these two albums received minimal attention in Canada, the duo found difficulty in attracting attention from major record labels. The band had their first taste of success when they received retroactive acclaim for the song "Candy Pop".

Len released a more hip-hop oriented album, You Can't Stop the Bum Rush, in 1999; a song from the album, "Steal My Sunshine", based on the old disco hit "More, More, More" by the Andrea True Connection, was also released that year, and climbed the popular charts both in Canada and the United States and became Len's biggest hit.  Len was nominated for a 2000 Juno Award as best new group, and the album was nominated as Best Alternative Album.

After the song, Len's fame dropped, but they continued to release albums until 2005, followed by a seven-year hiatus. In 2008, Marc announced the group's disbandment in a MySpace message. He stated: "...it looks like were not gonna make another len record. Just couldn't get it ( and everyone ) together." He still, however, announced he and Sharon would still record another album together. Despite this, Len returned with Marc and Sharon in October 2012, in which they released their fifth studio album It's Easy If You Try. The album was promoted with one single, "It's My Neighborhood", which had a music video featuring scenes of Toronto residents lip syncing to the song.

In 2016, Marc announced it is unlikely Len will record another album.

Discography

Studio albums

Extended plays

Singles

Awards

External links

References

Canadian musical duos
Canadian alternative rock groups
Canadian pop music groups
Musical groups established in 1991
1991 establishments in Ontario
Musical groups from Toronto
Sibling musical duos
Male–female musical duos
EMI Records artists
Epic Records artists
Columbia Records artists
DreamWorks Records artists